Palazzolo Milanese railway station is a railway station in Italy. It serves Palazzolo Milanese, a neighbourhood in the municipality of Paderno Dugnano. It was the first station of this line to be modernized with lifts, new and taller quays, shelters and underpasses. The station is located on Via Alessandro Coti Zelati.

Services
Palazzolo Milanese is served by lines S2 and S4 of the Milan suburban railway network, operated by the Lombard railway company Trenord.

See also
 Milan suburban railway network

References

External links

 Ferrovienord official site - Palazzolo Milanese railway station 

Railway stations in Lombardy
Ferrovienord stations
Railway stations opened in 1879
Milan S Lines stations